The 2014 British Figure Skating Championships were held in Sheffield on 26–30 November 2013. Medals were awarded in the disciplines of men's singles, ladies' singles, pair skating, and ice dancing on the senior level, junior, and novice levels. The results were among the criteria used to determine international assignments.

Medalists

Senior

Junior

Novice

Senior results

Men

Ladies

Pairs

Ice dancing

References

External links
 National Ice Skating Association of Great Britain and Northern Ireland 

British Figure Skating Championships, 2014
British Figure Skating Championships
Figure Skating Championships
Figure Skating Championships